Regine Israel (born 10 December 1958) is a German footballer. She played in two matches for the Germany women's national football team from 1984 to 1985.

References

External links
 

1958 births
Living people
German women's footballers
Germany women's international footballers
Place of birth missing (living people)
Women's association footballers not categorized by position